Johannes Greenberg (1887 Järva County – 1951) was an Estonian painter.

1904–1905 he studied at Ants Laikmaa's atelier school. 1910–1913 he studied at Munich Art Academy. After graduating he moved to Moscow and until 1920 he was a freelance artist. In 1920 he returned to Estonia, Tallinn.

His style of painting changed through time. In 1920s he fostered rather dark paintings with expressive style. In the beginning of 1930s he fostered art deco style.

References

1887 births
1951 deaths
Estonian painters